The Walsall Silver Thread Tapestries are a set of eleven artworks, in the form of tapestries, designed by the artist Hunt Emerson in conjunction with the various communities of Walsall, England and hand stitched by local people there during 2016. They depict the people, places, history and wildlife of the towns and districts that, since 1974, have formed the Metropolitan Borough of Walsall.

The works were commissioned with grant funding of £73,740 from Arts Council England, to commemorate the 25th (or silver) anniversary of Walsall Council's Creative Development Team. The team was disbanded before the project was completed.

The tapestries are in three sizes; a large one for Walsall itself, six of medium size and four smaller pieces. Work was carried out under the auspices of Creative Factory, a community interest company.

In January 2017, they were exhibited at The New Art Gallery Walsall, and afterwards at several venues around the borough, including St Matthew's Church, libraries, and Walsall Leather Museum. As of 2019 the tapestries are exhibited at Walsall Arboretum Visitor Centre.

The work is dedicated to Maxwell Bailey, manager of Creative Development Team, who secured the Arts Council grant, but died before work was completed.

The tapestries 

Each tapestry depicts several subjects:

Aldridge 

 Aldridge
 Aldridge in Bloom
 Aldridge War Memorial
 St Mary's Church and croft
 Old High Street, Aldridge, with a gold post box commemorating Ellie Simmonds
 Aldridge Airport and a Swallow Doretti automobile
 Aldridge Manor House
 The Elms, a public house
 The Avion, a cinema
 Rosie's walk, a charity event
 A brick from the Victoria Works
 Johnny Bullock, jockey
 Charles Holland, cyclist, and Charles George Bonner VC

Barr Beacon 

One of the smaller tapestries.

 Barr Beacon with stars
 Streetly, the BIP works there, and the latter's role as a World War II munitions factory
 Park Hall, Merrions Wood, and Great Barr Hall's Walsall Lodge 
 Pheasey and a dimpled golf ball
 John Curry OBE, Olympic skater

Birchills 

One of the smaller tapestries.

 Birchills and Smiths Flour Mill
 Reedswood Park swimming pool (demolished)
 Beechdale and Noddy Holder, who was born there
 Blakenall and the building of Walsall's first council houses, in 1920, at 94 and 96 Blakenall Lane
 Sir Harry Hinsley OBE
 Rob Halford of Judas Priest

Bloxwich 

 Bloxwich
 Bloxwich Memorial Fountain
 A preaching cross
 Awl blades, needles and tacks, as manufactured locally
 Sailing dinghies on the reservoir at Sneyd
 Haymaking with a  horse and cart, at Dudley Fields and Mossley
 The Showman cinema, latterly The Electric Palace
 The Royal Exchange, a public house
 The Bellfield, a public house
 Robert Plant and a Cavalier
 Sir Harry Smith Parkes
 Pat Collins, and one of his carousels

Brownhills 

 Brownhills
 The Brownhills Miner, a large public statue by John McKenna
 Clayhanger Country Park, with a red deer stag, red fox and a hoopoe
 The Brownhills canal festival
 A clock, known locally as the three-faced liar, as it was said to never show the same time on each dial
 The Staffordshire Hoard
 Brownhills Memorial Hall, known as; The Memo
 Brownhills Activity Centre
 St James' Church at Ogley Hay
 Reg Morris
 Erin O'Connor
 Howdle the Butcher
 Wild flowers, a dragonfly and a blue tit

Butts 

One of the smaller tapestries.

 Butts, and the archery butts from which it takes its name
 Walsall Wood
 Stubbers Green
 Shelfield
 Goscote and a public artwork there
 Coalpool and Ryecroft engine sheds
 Rushall Hall
 The Rushall Psalter
 Edward Leigh MP
 A bee

Pelsall 

 Pelsall
 Knitted poppies
 Pelsall Colliery
 Pelsall Canal Festival
 A butcher's bicycle
 St Michael's Church
 Cilla Black attending the first 'Blind Date' wedding at St Michael's Church in 1991
 Pelsall's fingerpost
 Daisy Coates, a Pelsall postwoman of the 1960s
 Boaz Bloomer, proprietor of Pelsall Iron Works

Palfrey 

One of the smaller tapestries.

 Palfrey and its statue of the type of horse from which it takes its name
 Chuckery and local firm Crabtree
 Highgate and its windmill tower
 Caldmore
 Pleck and its Hindu temple
 Bescot and the badge of Walsall FC, who are based there
 The White Hart, a former pub now residential flats

Darlaston 

 Darlaston
 The statue of Saint George and the Dragon at St George's Church
 Rubery Owen, an engineering company, and the company's David Owen
 The Sanna, Moxley, site of a sanatorium ("sanna"), now a wildlife reserve, with a Staffordshire knot
 Bentley Cairn at Bentley Hall
 St Lawrence's Church
 The Columbrarium, a listed building
 Nuts and bolts of the type manufactured by local companies
 Billy Muggins, a local peddler
 Jane Lane

Walsall 

The largest tapestry. The central panel depicts:

 The Zeppelin raid of 1916
 A peregrine falcon
 Racing pigeons
 The town's statue of Sister Dora
 A reel of sewing cotton

This is surrounded by smaller panels, depicting (clockwise from top left):

 St Matthew's Church
 Walsall College
 The gatehouse at Walsall Arboretum
 Walsall Town Hall
 Walsall Library and Museum
 The New Art Gallery Walsall, with artworks by Braque and Yinka Shonibare, and a bronze bust of Kathleen Garman by Lucian Freud
 Leather goods
 A leather worker
 Jerome K Jerome
 Meera Syal
 Noddy Holder and Sidney Webster
 Goldie
 Bust of John Henry Carless VC
 The Concrete Hippo, a 1972 public artwork by John Wood
 A leather saddle
 Saint Matthew

This tapestry also carries Hunt Emerson's signature and a cartoon of Maxwell Bailey.

Willenhall 

 Willenhall
 Willenhall coat of arms
 Willenhall clock tower
 New Invention and the Henry Squire & Sons' lock factory
 Henry VIII in Rough Wood, at Short Heath
 Willenhall Lock Museum
 Willenhall Guru Nanak Gurdwara
 The Bell, a public house
 Dr Joseph Tonks in a hot air balloon
 The Diamond Wedding of Derek and Julia Symmons
 Hilda Creanery and other local charity fund raisers

References 

 Walsall Silver Thread Tapestries information pack

External links 
 Creative Walsall project page
 Creative Factory project page (includes photographs of each tapestry)

2016 works
Modern tapestries
Walsall
History of the West Midlands (county)
History of Staffordshire